The 2016 Davidson Wildcats football team represented Davidson College in the 2016 NCAA Division I FCS football season. They were led by fourth-year head coach Paul Nichols and played their home games at Richardson Stadium. They were members of the Pioneer Football League. They finished the season 2–9, 0–8 in PFL play to finish in last place.

Schedule

Source: Schedule

Game summaries

at Georgetown

Kentucky Wesleyan

Livingstone

at Valparaiso

Stetson

at San Diego

Butler

at Marist

Jacksonville

at Campbell

Morehead State

References

Davidson
Davidson Wildcats football seasons
Davidson Wildcats football